Gravitational collapse is the contraction of an astronomical object due to the influence of its own gravity, which tends to draw matter inward toward the center of gravity. Gravitational collapse is a fundamental mechanism for structure formation in the universe. Over time an initial, relatively smooth distribution of matter will collapse to form pockets of higher density, typically creating a hierarchy of condensed structures such as clusters of galaxies, stellar groups, stars and planets.

A star is born through the gradual gravitational collapse of a cloud of interstellar matter. The compression caused by the collapse raises the temperature until thermonuclear fusion occurs at the center of the star, at which point the collapse gradually comes to a halt as the outward thermal pressure balances the gravitational forces. The star then exists in a state of dynamic equilibrium. Once all its energy sources are exhausted, a star will again collapse until it reaches a new equilibrium state.

Star formation

An interstellar cloud of gas will remain in hydrostatic equilibrium as long as the kinetic energy of the gas pressure is in balance with the potential energy of the internal gravitational force. Mathematically this is expressed using the virial theorem, which states that to maintain equilibrium, the gravitational potential energy must equal twice the internal thermal energy. If a pocket of gas is massive enough that the gas pressure is insufficient to support it, the cloud will undergo gravitational collapse. The critical mass above which a cloud will undergo such collapse is called the Jeans mass. This mass depends on the temperature and density of the cloud but is typically thousands to tens of thousands of solar masses.

Stellar remnants

At what is called the star's death (when a star has burned out its fuel supply), it will undergo a contraction that can be halted only if it reaches a new state of equilibrium. Depending on the mass during its lifetime, these stellar remnants can take one of three forms:

 White dwarfs, in which gravity is opposed by electron degeneracy pressure 
 Neutron stars, in which gravity is opposed by neutron degeneracy pressure and short-range repulsive neutron–neutron interactions mediated by the strong force
 Black hole, in which there is no force strong enough to resist gravitational collapse

White dwarf

The collapse of the stellar core to a white dwarf takes place over tens of thousands of years, while the star blows off its outer envelope to form a planetary nebula. If it has a companion star, a white dwarf-sized object can accrete matter from the companion star. Before it reaches the Chandrasekhar limit (about one and a half times the mass of the Sun, at which point gravitational collapse would start again), the increasing density and temperature within a carbon-oxygen white dwarf initiate a new round of nuclear fusion, which is not regulated because the star's weight is supported by degeneracy rather than thermal pressure, allowing the temperature to rise exponentially. The resulting runaway carbon detonation completely blows the star apart in a type Ia supernova.

Neutron star

Neutron stars are formed by the gravitational collapse of the cores of larger stars. They are the remnant of supernova types Ib, Ic, and II. Neutron stars are expected to have a skin or "atmosphere" of normal matter on the order of a millimeter thick, underneath which they are composed almost entirely of closely packed neutrons (popularly called "neutronium") with a slight dusting of free electrons and protons mixed in.

The appearance of stars composed of exotic matter and their internal layered structure is unclear since any proposed equation of state of degenerate matter is highly speculative. Other forms of hypothetical degenerate matter may be possible, and the resulting quark stars, strange stars (a type of quark star), and preon stars, if they exist, would, for the most part, be indistinguishable from a neutron star: In most cases, the exotic matter would be hidden under a crust of "ordinary" degenerate neutrons.

Black holes

According to Einstein's theory, for even larger stars, above the Landau–Oppenheimer–Volkoff limit, also known as the Tolman–Oppenheimer–Volkoff limit (roughly double the mass of the Sun) no known form of cold matter can provide the force needed to oppose gravity in a new dynamical equilibrium. Hence, the collapse continues with nothing to stop it.    
Once a body collapses to within its Schwarzschild radius it forms what is called a black hole, meaning a spacetime region from which not even light can escape. It follows from general relativity and the theorem of Roger Penrose that the subsequent formation of some kind of singularity is inevitable. Nevertheless, according to Penrose's cosmic censorship hypothesis, the singularity will be confined within the event horizon bounding the black hole, so the spacetime region outside will still have a well-behaved geometry, with strong but finite curvature, that is expected to evolve towards a rather simple form describable by the historic Schwarzschild metric in the spherical limit and by the more recently discovered Kerr metric if angular momentum is present.

On the other hand, the nature of the kind of singularity to be expected inside a black hole remains rather controversial. According to theories based on quantum mechanics, at a later stage, the collapsing object will reach the maximum possible energy density for a certain volume of space or the Planck density (as there is nothing that can stop it). This is the point at which it has been hypothesized that the known laws of gravity cease to be valid. There are competing theories as to what occurs at this point. For example loop quantum gravity predicts that a Planck star would form.  Regardless, it is argued that gravitational collapse ceases at that stage and a singularity, therefore, does not form.

Theoretical minimum radius for a star

The radii of larger mass neutron stars (about 2.8 solar mass)  are estimated to be about 12 km, or approximately 2.0 times their equivalent Schwarzschild radius.

It might be thought that a sufficiently massive neutron star could exist within its Schwarzschild radius (1.0 SR) and appear like a black hole without having all the mass compressed to a singularity at the center; however, this is probably incorrect. Within the event horizon, the matter would have to move outward faster than the speed of light in order to remain stable and avoid collapsing to the center. No physical force, therefore, can prevent a star smaller than 1.0 SR from collapsing to a singularity (at least within the currently accepted framework of general relativity; this does not hold for the Einstein–Yang-Mills–Dirac system). A model for the nonspherical collapse in general relativity with the emission of matter and gravitational waves has been presented.

See also
Big Crunch
Gravitational compression
Stellar evolution
Thermal runaway

References

Bibliography

External links 
 Gravitational collapse on arxiv.org

Black holes
Effects of gravitation
Neutron stars
White dwarfs
Star formation